Tim Cavanagh (born July 1953) is an American comedic musician.

Cavanagh has been featured on many nationally syndicated radio and television programs.  His parody of "99 Red Balloons" ("99 Dead Baboons") was the third most requested song on the Dr. Demento radio show in 1984.  He was a regular writer, guest, and contributor on The Danny Bonaduce Show, creating dozens of jingles and songs for use on the show.  Since 1997, he has had a regular segment on The Bob & Tom Show, heard every weekday morning in roughly 100 markets nationwide.  Cavanagh is also sometimes featured on local programs, including The Jim Krenn Show, a morning drive show in Pittsburgh.

Cavanagh's stand-up routines have been featured on television networks such as ABC, Showtime Network and Comedy Central.

External links
Official Tim Cavanagh website

American male songwriters
Parody musicians
American parodists
American comedy musicians
Living people
1953 births